Limoniopsis is a genus of flowering plants belonging to the family Plumbaginaceae.

Its native range is Turkey to Caucasus.

Species:

Limoniopsis davisii 
Limoniopsis owerinii

References

Plumbaginaceae
Caryophyllales genera